The Cultural Union of Albanians (UCAR) was an ethnic minority political party in Romania representing the Albanian community.

History
The UCAR contested the 1996 general elections, receiving 8,722 votes (0.07%) and winning a single seat in the Chamber of Deputies under the electoral law allowing political parties representing ethnic minority groups to be exempt from the electoral threshold only applied as long as they received 10% of the vote required for a single seat in the Chamber of Deputies. It was beaten by the League of Albanians of Romania in the 2000 elections, losing its seat.

Electoral history

References

Defunct political parties in Romania
Political parties of minorities in Romania
Albanians in Romania